Fransisca Hall, sometimes credited as Fran Hall, is a songwriter signed to Sony/ATV Music Publishing whose credits include: Kelly Clarkson, Britney Spears, Major Lazer, Selena Gomez, Icona Pop, Fitz and the Tantrums, Cheryl Cole, Eden xo, and Jasmine Thompson to name a few. She has also enjoyed success with numerous ad campaigns and film/television syncs including T-Mobile, Nissan, Jem and the Holograms, Pretty Little Liars, The Smurfs 2, and We're the Millers among many others.

Selected discography

References 

Sony Music Publishing artists
British songwriters
Women songwriters
Living people
Year of birth missing (living people)